Dołhobyczów is a village in Hrubieszów County, Lublin Voivodeship, in eastern Poland, close to the border with Ukraine. It is the seat of the gmina (administrative district) called Gmina Dołhobyczów.

The village has a population of 1,720. Road border crossing between Poland and Ukraine was opened temporarily in nearby village Dołhobyczów-Kolonia during Euro 2012 and in 24 June 2014 the permanent crossing was completed. Since 2015 the crossing is available for cars, coaches, trucks under 3.5 tonnes of mass, bikes and pedestrians.

External links
 www.nad-bugiem.com

References

Villages in Hrubieszów County
Kholm Governorate